Thomas Alfred Vardon (11 October 1874 – 13 October 1938) was a professional golfer from Jersey, Channel Islands, and the brother of golfer Harry Vardon, whom he sometimes played against professionally. From 1892 to 1909 he played in 18 Open Championships, finishing in the top-10 nine times. His best was a second-place finish to his brother Harry in 1903 at Prestwick, and other placings were 1897 at Royal Liverpool Golf Club, Hoylake – 8th, 1902 at Hoylake – 5th, 1904 at Royal St George's Golf Club, Sandwich, Kent – 4th, 1907 at Hoylake – T3.

Vardon tied for ninth place in the 1916 U.S. Open held June 29–30 at Minikahda Club in Minneapolis, Minnesota. He continued playing professional golf for four decades and became the oldest competitor at the 1930 U.S. Open at Interlachen Country Club.

Early life
Vardon was born at Grouville, Jersey, Channel Islands, to Philip George Vardon (1829–1914) and Elizabeth Augustine Bouchard (1837–1920). In 1894 he married Minnie Stevenson. They had two children, Stella F. Vardon and Leonard Harry Vardon.  Vardon was the head professional at a number of golf clubs including Ilkley Golf Club from 1893 to 1900 and Royal St George's Golf Club.

In 1909 Vardon emigrated to the United States, departing Southampton, England, aboard the SS Majestic on 16 June 1909 and arrived on 24 June 1909 in New York City. He had been given four months leave from Royal St George's to work at the Onwentsia Club in Lake Forest, Illinois. This was part of a deal that allowed Vardon to enter that year's U.S. Open held at Englewood Golf Club, New Jersey. He finished his career at White Bear Yacht Club, located at White Bear Lake in Minnesota, arriving in 1916 and remaining there until his death in 1938, although he retired on pension one year before his death.

Golf course architecture
Vardon was involved in golf course architecture, designing or helping with the design of 40 courses. Pamphlets that survived the clubhouse fire at White Bear Yacht Club in 1937 record that although the original golf course design was by William Watson, there was further development by Vardon and Donald Ross. Along with Robert W. Diehl, Vardon also wrote a how-to manual on golf, the Diehl-Vardon Golf Manual which was published in 1927 by the Western Golf Publishing Company.

Vardon designed courses

 Settle Golf Club, Settle, England (1895)
 Coventry Golf Club, Coventry, England (1911) - Course design Vardon, bunkers laid out by his brother Harry
 Kendal Golf Club, Kendal, England - alterations to the original layout
 Vardon Golf Club, Minot, North Dakota (1929) 
 Spooner Golf Club, Spooner, Wisconsin (1930)
 St. Augustines, Cliffsend, England (1907)
 Meadow Lark Country Club, Great Falls, Montana (1920)
 Stillwater Country Club, Stillwater, Minnesota (1924) - Vardon designed the original 9-hole course
 Strathpeffer Spa Golf Club, Strathpeffer, Scotland - added pot bunkers (1908)
 University of Minnesota, Les Bolstad Golf Course, Falcon Heights, Minnesota (1929)
 White Bear Yacht Club, White Bear Lake, Minnesota - Course design by William Watson, redevelopment by Vardon and Donald Ross
 Southview Country Club, West St. Paul, Minnesota (1919)
 Eau Claire Golf and Country Club (1928) -  Tom Vardon and Charles H. Ramsdell.

Death
Vardon died on 13 October 1938 in St. Paul, Minnesota.

Legacy
Vardon was posthumously inducted into the Minnesota PGA Golf Hall of Fame in 2012.

Results in major championships

Note: Vardon only played in The Open Championship and the U.S. Open.

WD = Withdrew
"T" indicates a tie for a place

Team appearances
England–Scotland Professional Match (representing England): 1903, 1904 (tie), 1905 (tie), 1906 (winners), 1907 (winners), 1909 (winners), 1910 (winners)

References

Further reading
Saywell, J. (1990) A History of the Ilkley Golf Club 1890–1990, Otley, Smith Settle

Jersey male golfers
Golf course architects
1874 births
1938 deaths